257 Reasons to Live is a Russian R-rated comedy-drama television series. The show is produced by Yellow, Black and White, Super Production and START Studio. Maxim Sveshnikov serves as director and Anna Dragunkina is an executive producer for the show.

The series stars Polina Maximova as Evgeniya Korotkova, a young woman who has defeated her cancer. Egor Koreshkov, Yulia Topolnitskaya, Maxim Lagashkin, Marusya Fomina and Roman Mayakin also star in the show. The series received a presentation pilot commitment at START in summer 2019. 257 Reasons to Live was ordered to series in July 2019. The series is primarily filmed in Moscow. "SUPER" renewed the series through its second season, principal photography began in July 2020 and wrapped in September.

The series debuted on START on March 26, 2020, the show had its TV premiere on TNT on June 8, 2020. Polina Maximova won Cannesseries Award for Best Performance on October 14, 2020.

The second season of the series premiered on START on November 4, 2020.

Premise

Season 1
Thirty-year-old Zhenya recovers from cancer and finds her life in shambles. Her troubles just beginning, she discovers an old list in her diary of 257 things she had wanted to do if she lived that gives her a reason to go on.

Season 2
Within a year, a new love appeared in Zhenya's life — Maxim, a beautiful and successful guy, whom she met in Bali and was going on a trip to Europe. Zhenya returns to Moscow to see her nephew and see her friends and does not plan to stay more than a couple of days. But unexpected circumstances will ruin all her plans.

Supportive Zhenya can not pass by the trouble and risks falling into the maelstrom of problems of her family and friends. In the life of Korotkova, all her past returns, including Konstantin. All this time, he kept Zhenya's notebook in the hope that her most important desire was connected with him. And Zhenya's father, who left the family many years ago, expects that his own daughters will accept him and take care of him. Sister Sonya, who, unlike Zhenya, is not ready to forgive her father, is ruining her successful blogger career and her family life with her own hands.

Cast and characters

Main
 Polina Maximova as Evgeniya "Zhenya" Korotkova, a 30-year-old young woman who recovered from cancer.
 Egor Koreshkov as Konstantin "Kostya", a tennis coach.
 Darya Rudenok as Sofia "Sonya", Zhenya's younger sister, Ruslan's girlfriend.
 Yulia Topolnitskaya as Anna "Anya", a pregnant friend and colleague of Zhenya.
 Anastasia Popova as Irina "Ira", a friend and colleague of Zhenya
 Alexey Zolotovitskiy as Nikolay "Kolya" Muratov, a colleague of Zhenya.
 Roman Mayakin as Igor Sergeyevich, CEO of the company, Zhenya's chief.
 Mikhail Grishchenko as Ruslan "Rus", Sonya's boyfriend.
 Alexander Sokolovskiy as Maxim "Max", Zhenya's new boyfriend.

Recurring
 Maxim Lagashkin as Oleg, Kostya's friend.
 Asya Gromova as Daniella "Danya", Kostya's daughter.
 Marusya Fomina as Viktoria "Vika", a colleague of Kostya, his lover.
 Vitaliy Shcherbina as Nikita, Danya's boyfriend.

Guest
 Sergey Godin as Dmitry "Mitya", an ex-boyfriend of Zhenya, he is dating with Alisa.
 Anna Nevskaya as Alisa Yuryevna, Zhenya's oncologist, she is dating with Mitya.
 Kirill Nagiev as Artyom.

Episodes

Season 1 (2020)

Season 2 (2020–21)

Release
257 Reasons to Live premiered on the streaming service START on March 26, 2020. START releases 257 Reasons episodes on a weekly basis.

The series had its TV premiere on TNT on June 8, 2020.

The first two episodes of the second season premiered on START on November 4, 2020.

References

External links 
 
 

2020s Russian television series
2020 Russian television series debuts
Russian drama television series